{{DISPLAYTITLE:C20H17F3N2O4}}
The molecular formula C20H17F3N2O4 (molar mass: 406.355 g/mol) may refer to:

 Floctafenine
 Tasquinimod

Molecular formulas